I Am a Ghost, is a 2012 American horror film directed by H.P. Mendoza. It debuted at the 2012 San Francisco International Asian American Film Festival.

Plot

During an indeterminable time period, Emily (Anna Ishida), a troubled ghost who died, haunts her own Victorian house every day, wondering why she can't leave. With the help of Sylvia, (Jeannie Barroga), a clairvoyant hired to rid the house of spirits, Emily is forced into a 'patient/therapist' relationship, uncovering disturbing mysteries about her past that may help her move on to 'the next place'.

Cast
 Anna Ishida as Emily
 Juliet Heller as Emily #2
 Diana Tenes as Emily #3
 Jeannie Barroga as Sylvia (voice)
 Rick Burkhardt as Demon
 Jef Cunningham as Doctor (voice)
 Maia Mendoza as Sister (voice)
 Rachel Wong as Mother (voice)

Production

I Am a Ghost cost roughly $10,000 with a substantial amount of it raised on Kickstarter, $7500 of which was for actual production.

Critical reception

Dennis Harvey of Variety wrote, "within its chosen narrative and physical limitations, the pic is artfully and resourcefully crafted on a small budget." Shawn Handling from HorrorNews.net gave the film a negative review, criticizing the script, acting, and runtime, while also commending the cinematography and special effects. Scott Hallam from Dread Central rated the film a score of three and a half out of five, criticizing the first half as "repetitive", while commending the effects, and finale.

Awards
 Best Picture - Bram Stoker International Film Festival 2012
 Best Horror Film - PollyGrind Film Festival
 Best Horror Director - SF Weekly 2012
 Best Horror Director - Tucson Terrorfest 2012
 Best Actress - Tucson Terrorfest 2012

References

External links
 Official website
 
 

2012 films
2012 horror films
2012 independent films
2010s supernatural horror films
American haunted house films
American independent films
American supernatural horror films
Films about death
Films shot in San Francisco
2010s ghost films
2010s English-language films
2010s American films